Vinícius Simon (born 17 November 1986) is a Brazilian footballer who plays for Confiança as a central defender.

Career
Born in Limeira, São Paulo, Simon graduated from Santos' prolific youth setup. He made his first team – and Série A – debut on 3 August 2008, starting in a 1–3 home loss against Coritiba.

In January 2009 Simon was loaned to fellow league team Santo André, in a season-long deal. However, he only appeared rarely for Ramalhão, which was subsequently relegated.

On 23 January 2010 Simon joined Criciúma also in a temporary deal. He was regularly used during the year's Campeonato Catarinense, scoring a goal against Joinville on 4 April, and returned to Peixe in May.

Simon was sparingly used in the following years, and moved to América-MG on 26 May 2012, on loan until December. He returned to Santos in January 2013, being again loaned to Sport Recife in July.

In January 2014 Simon was expected to join Goiás, but remained in Santos due to Edu Dracena and Gustavo Henrique's injuries; however, he also suffered an injury, being sidelined until August. On 8 August he returned to action, but only played 26 minutes in a 1–2 away loss against Londrina, being taken off with two hip injuries.

On 6 March 2015 Simon signed a short-term permanent deal with Vila Nova, after being released by Santos in January.

On 1 May 2017 Simon signed with XV de Piracicaba for Campeonato Brasileiro Série D.

Career statistics

References

External links
 Vila Nova official profile 
 

1986 births
Living people
People from Limeira
Brazilian footballers
Association football defenders
Campeonato Brasileiro Série A players
Campeonato Brasileiro Série B players
Campeonato Brasileiro Série C players
Santos FC players
Esporte Clube Santo André players
Criciúma Esporte Clube players
América Futebol Clube (MG) players
Sport Club do Recife players
Vila Nova Futebol Clube players
Botafogo Futebol Clube (SP) players
Esporte Clube XV de Novembro (Piracicaba) players
Associação Desportiva Confiança players
Footballers from São Paulo (state)